Catherine Todd Bailey (born 1951) is an American diplomat who served as Ambassador of the United States of America to Latvia (Appointed, 29 November 2004 Left post on 4 February 2008).  Bailey was awarded the Honor of the Order of the Three Stars by the president of Latvia, the highest honor given to an individual for outstanding public service.

Bailey is the Chair of the Department of Transportation Advisory Committee on Human Trafficking for the United States Chamber of Commerce. She was a Republican National Committee member from Kentucky between 2000 and 2004.

Early life and education 
Bailey was born in Indiana in 1951. She received a bachelor's degree from Franklin College.

Career 
Early in her career, Bailey worked for eight years as an elementary school teacher, served as public relations consultant for Creative Alliance and as a consultant for the American Bar Association.  In 1984, she co-founded the Louisville chapter of Ronald McDonald House, a charitable organization that provides housing and support for families of critically and terminally ill children.  From 2000 to 2004, Bailey served as Republican National Committee member from Kentucky.

On September 8, 2004, President George W. Bush announced his intent to nominate Bailey to become the United States Ambassador to Latvia. On November 21, 2004, her nomination was confirmed in the Senate by voice vote and was sworn in as ambassador by former U.S. Secretary of State Colin Powell on January 13, 2005.

In a speech Bailey gave on 16 October 2007 at The University of Latvia, Bailey said "We have seen a pattern of events that appear to be inconsistent with some of our shared values.”  It is believed she was alluding to several issues including Prime Minister Aigars Kalvītis stand off with Vaira Vīķe-Freiberga over the powers of the security services, phone recordings between some judges and lawyers, and Kalvītis‘ removal of the anti-corruption bureau.  Her comments received mixed reactions but were mostly positive.

Personal 
In 2000, Bailey, and her husband Irving W. Bailey II, founded Operation Open Arms, Inc., a private child placing agency in Kentucky that places children of incarcerated mothers into foster families. Bailey has received accolades for her work with Operation Open Arms, including receipt of the 2003 Unsung Heroine Award sponsored by Mitsubishi Motors.

Bailey has served as a volunteer board member for numerous organizations, including: the Kentucky Opera, the Kentucky Arts and Crafts Foundation, McConnell Center for Political Leadership & Excellence, University of Louisville and the Kennedy Center.

References

Ambassadors of the United States to Latvia
1951 births
United States Chamber of Commerce people
American women ambassadors
Ambassadors of the United States
Republican National Committee members
Living people
21st-century American women